The Cheeky Girls are a Romanian singing duo consisting of identical twin sisters Gabriela and Monica Irimia (both born 31 October 1982). After appearing as auditionees on Popstars: The Rivals, they achieved success in the UK charts with four top 10 hits between 2002 and 2004. They are best known for their debut single, "Cheeky Song (Touch My Bum)", which has sold more than 1.2 million units internationally. The Cheeky Girls released their debut studio album, PartyTime, in 2003 which reached number 14 in the UK Albums Chart.

Biography

Gabriela and Monica were born on 31 October 1982 to Doru and Margit Irimia. Gabriela is older by 10 minutes. Their early life in Romania consisted of studying gymnastics and ballet and touring with the Hungarian National Opera. Moving to the United Kingdom with their mother in 2002, the girls shot to fame as the Cheeky Girls after auditioning on two British TV shows, Channel 4's Model Behaviour and more importantly Popstars: The Rivals.  Following two appearances on the show with their audition, which had judges Pete Waterman and Louis Walsh not knowing what to say – Waterman was later quoted as saying they were the worst act ever – various record companies approached the Granada Press Office.  The Press Office contacted Paul Holland at Granada Ventures, who was able to secure them a deal with the Multiply label, part of Telstar Records.  "Cheeky Song (Touch My Bum)" was swiftly recorded and released in the first week in December.  Entering the chart at number two, the single remained in the top five for five consecutive weeks, four of them at number two.

This was quickly followed up with two more top three hits, "Take Your Shoes Off" and "(Hooray, Hooray!) It's a Cheeky Holiday!".  Their style of music is primarily disco-pop, aimed at the pre-teen market.  Most of their songs are written by their mother, who also acts as their manager.

On 4 August 2006, the Evening Standard reported that the Cheeky Girls were "at rock bottom" and facing bankruptcy action in court owing to not having been paid by their now-defunct record company, Telstar Records. The article said that the women owed £4,500 in unpaid taxes, along with other bills, and that Telstar owed them £2.2 million. Later, it was reported that they owed £130,000 in total.

In September 2009, the act released their Cheeky Girls make-up range, aimed at the young teen market.

On 7 March 2013, the women appeared on the This Week BBC TV programme discussing the subject of Romanian immigration to the UK with host Andrew Neil. This followed a short video report by Monica talking about British fears of an invasion of benefit-seekers from their homeland. They previously appeared on the show on 10 July 2008.

Personal lives
In December 2006, it was revealed by the tabloids that former Liberal Democrat MP Lembit Öpik had broken up with long-time fiancée, ITV weather presenter Siân Lloyd, and was now romantically involved with Gabriela. Öpik "passed documentation on to the singers' constituency MP and spoke to a Home Office minister," when the Irimias were facing deportation to Romania. The couple announced their engagement in April 2008 after Öpik proposed in Rome, but the engagement was short lived and a breakup was announced three months later.
In 2016, Monica married her fiancé of four years, Shaun Taylor, who works as a building contractor.

Discography

Albums

Singles

References

External links

The Cheeky Girls on Myspace

1982 births
Living people
Romanian emigrants to the United Kingdom
Identical twin females
Musical groups established in 2002
Musicians from Cluj-Napoca
Female musical duos
Pop music duos
Romanian pop music groups
Romanian dance musical groups
British pop girl groups
British dance girl groups
British Eurodance groups
Romanian Eurodance groups
Britain's Got Talent contestants
Romanian twins
Twin musical duos
2002 establishments in Romania
British people of Romanian descent
21st-century British  women singers
Telstar Records artists